Carrbrook is a village east of Stalybridge, in Cheshire, Greater Manchester, England. The area still has many seventeenth and eighteenth-century buildings. Much of the late-nineteenth and the early-twentieth-century village was built during the industrial boom brought by the printworks. In the 1970s modern Housing estates were built next to the old village on the lower flank of Harridge Pike. The view to the east of Carrbrook is dominated by the steep-sided Buckton Hill, on the summit of which is located Buckton Castle. Neighbouring communities include Millbrook, Heyheads and Mossley.

Many properties in Carrbrook were threatened by a large wildfire burning on Buckton Moor in late June 2018. The fires burned for several weeks and the damage caused is still visible to this day. On 26 June, 50 properties in Carrbrook were evacuated as the fire advanced towards the settlement. Carrbrook is now part of a high fire risk zone.

The village school is named Buckton Vale Primary. The current school is the 3rd building.

Music
Every year on Whit Friday, Carrbrook is host to a popular brass band contest which takes place in the car park opposite the Buckton Vale Institute.

References

External links
Carrbrook Brass Band
A walk through Carrbrook provided by the Tameside Borough Council website.
Carrbrook Village - Community website.
Carrbrook Heritage Trail - A local history project commissioned on behalf of the British National Lottery heritage fund by the Carrbrook Heritage Group.
Tameside Local History Forum
Carrbrook Whit Friday Brass Band Contest

Areas of Greater Manchester
Geography of Tameside
Towns and villages of the Peak District